David William Logan Westhead (born 1 June 1963) is an English actor.

Early life
Westhead was born in Ely, Cambridgeshire. He studied drama at Bristol University before going on to RADA, from where he graduated in 1987, after which he joined the Actors' Touring Company.

Career
He is notable as having been a member of the regular cast of The Bill, Criminal Justice, Blackeyes, Stanley and the Women, Bramwell, The Silence, Life Begins, The Lakes, Grafters, The Time of Your Life and W1A.  He has also had guest appearances in Wycliffe (Wycliffe and the Pea Green Boat as Freddie Tremaine), Doctor Who (The Shakespeare Code, as William Kempe), Fast Freddie, The Widow and Me as Charlie, Foyle's War (A War of Nerves), Midsomer Murders (The House in the Woods), Agatha Christie's Poirot (Cards on the Table) and Lewis (The Gift of Promise).  He has also appeared in the film Mrs Brown (as the Prince of Wales), and onstage he has played Tristan Tzara in a 1993 British production of Travesties.

David has for many years been a leading actor with The Royal Shakespeare Company, Royal National Theatre, and The Royal Court Theatre. His credits include the BAFTA nominated Donovan Quick, Wilde, Stage Beauty, 'Beyond the Sea', Golden Globe winning Gideon's Daughter, Wallis & Edward, 'Beneath the Skin', Emmy Award winning The Lost Prince, 'She's Gone', 'The Time of Your Life', 'The Key', 'Safe House', 'The Lakes', Turning World, Grafters, 'The Unknown Soldier', My Fragile Heart, Blackeyes. David has the title role in "Suicide Man" and has appeared in "The Real McCoy" for the BBC in the Cape Flats Townships of South Africa. In 2010 he starred as Frank Evans in the BBC's flagship drama "The Silence".

In 2002 he and two colleagues founded Wilton Pictures, a production company specialising in making documentaries.

Also a lecturer in drama it was whilst he was teaching in South Africa that he met a group of disadvantaged youngsters with potential as photographers. Along with professional photographer John Cole - who, like David, lives in Brighton - he put them on an eight-week crash course in photography, enabling them to make a professional living from it. The exhibition of their work, entitled 'Wembley to Soweto', was exhibited at London's South Bank in July 2011. In 2014, he played Neil Reid in W1A.

In 2016, Westhead played the role of Tony Blair's minder in the BBC television film Reg. In 2016, he appeared in the Netflix comedy series Lovesick.

He played Prime Minister John Vosler in the 2018 BBC series Bodyguard.

Audio work
Voice talent : Eric Ambler's Topkapi for BBC Radio 4 Extra

References

External links

1963 births
Living people
Alumni of RADA
English male stage actors
English male television actors
People from Ely, Cambridgeshire
Male actors from Cambridgeshire
20th-century English male actors
21st-century English male actors